Stephanie Nyombayire (born December 1986) is the Director General of Communication in Office of the President of Rwanda, a representative for the Genocide Intervention Network, and a Rwandan native. She graduated from Kent School in Kent, Connecticut in 2004 and Swarthmore College in Swarthmore, Pennsylvania in June 2008.

Stephanie lost dozens of her family members in the Rwandan genocide in 1994, although she herself was not in the country at the time. As a result, she felt particularly attuned to situations of genocide, and in 2004, joined with Mark Hanis and Andrew Sniderman to form the Genocide Intervention Network to advocate for intervention in the Darfur conflict in Sudan.

In 2005, Stephanie was asked to introduce President Bill Clinton at the 2005 Campus Progress National Student Conference on behalf of GI-Net. Highlighting Clinton's apology for the world's inaction during the Rwandan genocide, Nyombayire encouraged the audience to "always follow our words with action."

Also in 2005, Stephanie traveled to Darfurian refugee camps in Chad after she was denied entry to Sudan. Her trip, along with fellow students from Georgetown and Boston University, was documented in the film "Translating Genocide," which premiered on MTV on March 12, 2006.

In 2007, Stephanie was named one Glamour magazine's Top Ten College Women for her work on Darfur. Stephanie was honored by Rwandan First Lady Jeannette Kagame for her role in founding the Genocide Intervention Network, and in 2008 was invited to speak on a Clinton Global Initiative panel on student activism.

External links
 Biography on the Genocide Intervention Network website
 Information from the MTVu website
 Feature on Stephanie and other student activists on Darfur from the Swarthmore College website
 "MTVUniversity Names Swarthmore Freshman 'Sudan Correspondent'," press release from Swarthmore College, 14 March 2005
 "Building Peace on Campus and Beyond," Clinton Global Initiative panel, March 15, 2008

News Coverage

 "Telling the stories of Sudan's horror," Delaware County Times, March 20, 2005
 "Students take action to aid Sudan," The Philadelphia Inquirer, April 11, 2005
 "Rwandan teen, excelling in U.S., now lobbies for Darfur aid," Associated Press, June 14, 2005
 "Learning from the tragedy of the past," The Dallas Morning News, July 2, 2005
 Transcript of Stephanie Nyombayire's introduction of former President Bill Clinton, Campus Progress National Student Conference, July 13, 2005
 "3 Students' Perspective on Tragedy of Darfur," The New York Times, March 11, 2006
 "A student, 16, confronts the unthinkable," The Philadelphia Inquirer, June 14, 2006
 "Glamour Hero: She lost 100 family members to genocide," Glamour magazine, March 1, 2007
 "She's battling genocide," Glamour magazine, May 1, 2007
 "Rwandan Native Stephanie Nyombayire will not Sleep Until the World Wakes Up," ObaaSema Magazine, April 15, 2007
 "Stephanie Nyombayire '08 Honored by Rwanda's First Lady," Swarthmore College News
 "Vanguard Peace Warrior," Newsweek, April 20, 2008

1986 births
Kent School alumni
Living people
Political activists from Pennsylvania
People of the War in Darfur
Rwandan human rights activists
Swarthmore College alumni